”Elachista” parvipulvella is a moth of the superfamily  Gelechioidea. It was described from Texas.

Taxonomy
The separate condition of the hindwing veins RS and Ml would be unique in Elachistidae and the ventral spurs in tarsal articles are rarely present in Elachista. Based on this, the species has been removed from the family Elachistidae. The abdomen of the holotype is missing, meaning the correct family association of the species cannot currently be established and it is currently placed incertae sedis within the superfamily Gelechioidea.

References

Moths described in 1875
parvipulvella
Moths of North America